Fairplain, Fair Plain or Fairplains may refer to:

Fairplains, North Carolina
Fairplain Township, Michigan in Montcalm County
Fair Plain, Michigan in Berrien County
Fairplain, West Virginia in Jackson County, West Virginia